Margaret Foster is a netball coach.

Margaret Foster may also refer to:

Margaret Foster (writer), see List of winners and shortlisted authors of the Booker Prize for Fiction
Margaret Foster, character in 9 to 5 (film)
Margaret Foster, character in Emily (film)
Margaret D. Foster, American chemist

See also
Maggie Foster (disambiguation)
Peggy Foster, bassist